The 2015 BYU Cougars football team represented Brigham Young University (BYU) in the 2015 NCAA Division I FBS football season. The Cougars, led by 11th-year head coach Bronco Mendenhall, played their home games at LaVell Edwards Stadium. This was the fifth year BYU competed as an NCAA Division I FBS independent. They finished the season 9–4. They were invited to the Las Vegas Bowl, where they lost to rival Utah.

On December 4, Mendenhall was hired as the head coach at Virginia. He stayed and coached the Cougars in the Las Vegas Bowl. He finished at BYU with an 11-year record of 99–43.

On December 19, Oregon State defensive coordinator and former BYU fullback Kalani Sitake was named BYU's new head coach.

Before the season
After a season in which the entire offensive staff was changed, BYU is expected to have stability in the coaching ranks as every coach is expected to return.

2015 recruits

2015 returning missionaries

2015 departures
The following Cougars graduated, transferred, or chose to serve two-year church missions after the 2013 season and didn't return to the team in 2015.

Media

Football Media Day
Football Media Day took place on June 24, 2015. It aired live on BYUtv, with a simulcast on ESPN3. The Media Day featured the start time and TV network of all but 2 home games. Player interviews were also conducted on byutv.org.

Cougar IMG Sports Network Affiliates

KSL 102.7 FM and 1160 AM- Flagship Station (Salt Lake City/ Provo, UT and ksl.com)BYU Radio- Nationwide (Dish Network 980, Sirius XM 143, and byuradio.org)KIDO- Boise, ID (football only)KTHK- Blackfoot/ Idaho Falls/ Pocatello/ Rexburg, IDKMGR- Manti, UTKSUB- Cedar City, UTKDXU- St. George, UTKSHP- Las Vegas, NV (football only)

Roster

Schedule

Game summaries

Nebraska

Sources:

Uniform combination: white helmet, white jersey, blue pants.
BYU entered Lincoln as 6-point underdogs, with Bronco Mendenhall taking back defensive play-calling responsibilities, and with Taysom Hill looking to prove last years Heisman talk wasn't outside the box. The Cougars entered the game with 4 starters being suspended due to last years bowl game: defensive lineman Tomasi Laulile, safety Kai Nacua, wide receiver Trey Dye, and linebacker Sione Takitaki. The revamped BYU defense gave up huge amounts of passing yardage, giving up 180 yards passing in the first quarter alone. On the way they lost 3 defensive starters to injury, including nose tackle Travis Tuiloma 4–6 weeks.

Taysom Hill kept BYU in the game with his scrambling, including a 21-yard run which evened it up at 14. On the 21-yard run though, Hill came to an abrupt stop in the endzone. He was taken into the locker room, where he was diagnosed with a foot sprain of some sort. A Fred Warner fumble recovery gave BYU the ball back quickly. Freshman QB Tanner Mangum came in on BYU's next possession for 2 plays: a 9-yard run and a 9-yard pass, before Hill returned. The Cougars drove the rest of the field before Hill found Mitch Mathews for the first of his 2 receiving touchdowns.

A Hill interception in the third reversed the tide back to Nebraska. After missing 12-of-15 passes in the 2nd quarter Nebraska QB Tommy Armstrong, Jr. once again shredded the BYU D for more than 100 yards receiving in the 3rd. Hill would keep in close, driving possession after possession into Nebraska's end of the field, but the interception and a 4th down stop seemed to keep Nebraska with the momentum.

In the 4th Hill limped off the field. BYU sent him back into the locker room and sent Mangum back onto the field. Mangum went on to complete 6/10 in the 4th quarter for 102 yards, but the most memorable play came on the final possession. With only one second left Mangum scrambled right and threw the hail mary to the end zone. Mathews came all the way across the field and caught the 42-yard pass for the touchdown, ending Nebraska's 29-year home opener winning streak.
   
While Mangum entered the halls of Cougar lore with the touchdown pass, the news wasn't so good for BYU after the game. Hill was diagnosed with a lisfranc injury, which would be season-ending.

Game Stats: 
Passing: BYU- Taysom Hill 21–34–1—268, Tanner Mangum 7–11–0—111; Nebraska- Tommy Armstrong Jr. 24–41–1—319.
Rushing: BYU- Taysom Hill 9–72, Adam Hine 4–37, Tanner Mangum 5–26, Mitch Juergens 1–7, Algernon Brown 3–1, Nate Carter 4-(−11); Nebraska- Terrell Newby 10–43, Imani Cross 7–34, Alonzo Moore 2–24, Mikale Wilcon 6–14, Brandon Reilly 1–11, Tommy Armstrong Jr. 9–2, Jamal Turner 2-(−2).
Receiving: BYU- Nick Kurtz 5–123, Mitch Mathews 3–69, Terenn Houk 4–59, Devon Blackmon 5–43, Colby Pearson 3–28, Mitch Juergens 3–24, Moroni Laulu-Pututau 1–10, Algernon Brown 2–9, Kurt Henderson 1–8, Tyler Cook 1–6; Nebraska- Jordan Westerkamp 7–107, Brandon Reilly 5–70, Alonzo Moore 3–48, Mikale Wilbon 2–28, Jamal Turner 2–21, Stanley Morgan Jr. 2–19, Lane Hovey 2–17, Trey Foster 1–9.
Interceptions: BYU- Micah Hanneman 1–0; Nebraska- Nate Gerry 1–43.

Boise State

Sources:

Uniform combination: white helmet, white jersey, white pants.

Game Stats: 
Passing: BSU- Ryan Finley 25–38–3—297; BYU- Tanner Mangum 17–28–2—309.
Rushing: BSU- Jeremy McNichols 15–46, Devan Demas 5–21, Finley 9–5, Shane Williams-Rhodes 1–3, Team 1-(−11); BYU- Adam Hine 19–93, Algernon Brown 5–22, Mitch Juergens 2–4, Nate Carter 2–2, Team 1-(−11), Mangum 10-(−38).
Receiving: BSU- Williams-Rhodes 11–107, Chaz Anderson 3–66, McNichols 5–49, David Lucero 1–26, Holden Huff 1–17, Jake Roh 1–15, Thomas Sperbeck 2–13, Demas 1–4; BYU- Mitch Juergens 4–172, Devon Blackmon 6–105, Mitch Mathews 5–32, Hine 1–2, Brown 1-(−2).
Interceptions: BSU- Donte Deayon 2–29; BYU- Kai Nacua 3–76.

UCLA

Sources:

Uniform combination: white helmet, white jersey, blue pants.

Game Stats: 
Passing: BYU- Tanner Mangum 30–47–1—244; UCLA- Josh Rosen 11–23–3—106.
Rushing: BYU- Adam Hine 23–149, Nate Carter 7–22, Harvey Langi 2–8, Trey Dye 1–1, Tanner Mangum 8-(−19); UCLA- Paul Perkins 26–219, Nate Starks 7–81, Soso Jamabo 2-(−1), Team 3-(−3).
Receiving: BYU- Mitch Mathews 9–84, Mitch Juergens 5–42, Nick Kurtz 4–38, Terenn Houk 4–37, Devon Blackmon 3–23, Colby Pearson 2–8, Hine 2–8, Mangum 1–4; UCLA- Jordan Payton 4–59, Thomas Duarte 3–33, Mossi Johnson 2–8, Kenneth Walker 1–4, Jamabo 1–2.
Interceptions: BYU- Langi 2–21, Kai Nacua 1–0; UCLA- Myles Jack 1–3.

Michigan

Sources:

Uniform combination: white helmet, white jersey, blue pants.

Game Stats:
Passing: BYU- Tanner Mangum 12–28–0—55; MICH- Jake Rudock 14–25–0—194.
Rushing:  BYU- Adam Hine 8–33, Franci Bernard 4–30, Nate Carter 3–9, Team 1-(−4), Mangum 6-(−18); MICH- De'Veon Smith 16–125, Rudock 10–33, Derrick Green 10–28, Drake Johnson 5–26, Sione Houma 4–17, Blake O'Neill 1–9, Ty Isaac 2–9, Ross Douglas 3–7. 
Receiving:  BYU- Devon Blackmon 1–14, Colby Pearson 2–11, Nick Kurtz 2–10, Mitch Juergens 2–6, Hine 1–5, Mitch Mathews 1–4, Carter 1–4, Teremm Houk 1–3, M Laulu-Pututau 1-(−2); MICH- Amara Darboh 4–57, Jake Butt 1–41, Khalid Hill 2–39, Jehu Chesson 2–17, Drake Johnson 1–14, Ian Bunting 1–10, Green 1–7, AJ Williams 1–7, Henry Poggi 1–2.

UConn

Sources:

Uniform combination: white helmet, blue jersey, white pants.

Game Stats: 
Passing: UConn- Bryant Shirreffs 14–28–2—168; BYU- Tanner Mangum 35–53–2—265, Team 0–1–0—0.
Rushing: UConn- Arkee Newsome 13–68, Max Delorenzo 1–2, Ron Johnson 1-(−3), Shirreffs 12-(−5); BYU- Algernon Brown 18–95, Francis Bernard 11–69, Nate Carter 8–14, Riley Burt 1–5, Mangum 3-(−9).
Receiving: UConn- Newsome 4–63, Tommy Myers 2–35, Tyraiq Beals 3–33, Delorenzo 3–24, Noel Thomas 2–13; BYU- Terenn Houk 6–129, Mitch Mathews 8–78, Mitch Juergens 10–74, Nick Kurtz 5–52, Devon Blackmon 3–15, Carter 1–7, Brown 1–6, Trey Dye 1–4.
Interceptions: UConn- Jamar Summers 1–26, Jhavon Williams 1–0; BYU- Bronson Kaufusi 1–10, Michael Shelton 1–4.

East Carolina

Sources:

Uniform combination: white helmet with royal blue decals and royal blue chromium facemasks, royal blue jersey, white pants.

Game Stats: 
Passing: ECU: Blake Kemp 28–36–1—371, James Summers 2–6–0—14; BYU: Tanner Mangum 24–33–0—332, Beau Hoge 1–5–1—9.
Rushing: ECU: Chris Hairston 15–77, Summers 10–55, Shawn Furlow 3–4, Kemp 4-(−3); BYU: Algernon Brown 24–134, Francis Bernard 8–30, Jonny Linehan 1–7, Trey Dye 1–5, Riley Burt 1–4, Hoge 3-(−3), Mangum 5-(−10).
Receiving: ECU: Isaiah Jones 10–97, Bryce Williams 5–87, Trevon Brown 6–84, Davon Grayson 5–53, Chris Hairston 3–50, Daquan Barnes 1–8, Anthony Scott 0–5, Christian Matau 0–3; BYU: Devon Blackmon 9–142, Mitch Mathews 4–72, Terenn Houk 4–43, Brown 2–20, Mitch Juergens 1–17, Colby Pearson 2–16, Nick Kurtz 1–12, Kurt Henderson 1–11, Trey Dye 1–8.
Interceptions: ECU: Yiannis Bowden 1–7; BYU: Fred Warner 1–0.

Cincinnati

Sources:

Uniform combination: white helmet, blue jersey, white pants.

Game Stats: 
Passing: CIN: Hayden Moore 15–30–0—219, Tion Green 1–1–0—1; BYU: Tanner Mangum 19–32–1—252.
Rushing: CIN: Mike Boone 9–53, Tion Green 9–30, Hosey Williams 8–29, Moore 20–9; BYU: Algernon Brown 20–88, Francis Bernard 4–60, Riley Burt 2–48, Nate Carter 2–5, Trey Dye 1-(−4).
Receiving: CIN: Shaq Washington 5–103, Alex Chisum 2–45, Max Morrison 4–31, Mike Boone 3–25, Nate Cole 1–15, DJ Dowdy 1–1; BYU: Nick Kurtz 6–119, Mitch Mathews 3–54, Devon Blackmon 3–32, Colby Pearson 2–21, Terenn Houk 1–10, Bernard 2–7, Brown 1–5, Mitch Juergens 1–4.
Interceptions: CIN: Kevin Brown 1–0.

Wagner

Sources:

Uniform combination: white helmet, blue jersey, white pants.

Game Stats: 
Passing: WAG: Alex Thomson 7–12–1—43, Chris Andrews 1–4–0—3; BYU: Tanner Mangum 12–13–0—237, Beau Hoge 8–11–0—117, Koy Detmer Jr. 3–3–0—57.
Rushing: WAG: Thomson 8–28, Otis Wright 12–25, Denzel Knight 12–15, Matthias McKinnon 6–12, Andrews 5-(−1); BYU: Algernon Brown 6–109, Nate Carter 10–102, Francis Bernard 6–54, Hoge 12–47, Colby Hansen 5–17, Toloa Ho Ching 2–10, Detmer Jr. 1-(−9).
Receiving: WAG: Ryan Owens 2–28, Calee Scepaniak 2–6, Andre Yevchinecz 2–4, Anthony Carrington 1–5, Lloyd Smith 1–3; BYU: David Kessler 3–78, Terenn Houk 2–65, Trey Dye 2–55, Mitch Juergens 2–52, Mitch Mathews 3–44, Devon Blackmon 2–26, Josh Weeks 3–23, Jake Ziolkowski 2–20, Colby Pearson 1–16, Nick Kurtz 1–14, Akile Davis 1–9, Moroni Laulu-Pututau 1–9.
Interceptions: BYU: Jordan Praetor 1–3.

San Jose State

Sources:

Uniform combination: white helmet, white jersey, blue pants.

Game Stats: 
Passing: BYU: Tanner Mangum 23–37–1—293; SJSU: Kenny Potter 18–25–0—147, Tim Crawley 0–1–0—0.
Rushing: BYU: Algernon Brown 12–41, Adam Hiné 3–9, Francis Bernard 2–5, TEAM 4-(−9), Mangum 4-(−10); SJSU: Tyler Ervin 23–80, Kenny Potter 12–20, Hansell Wilson 1–15, Thomas Tucker 2–7.
Receiving: BYU: Devon Blackmon 6–102, Mitch Mathews 4–62, Nick Kurtz 3–33, Bernard 3–33, Terenn Houk 4–32, Remington Peck 1–18, Colby Pearson 1–8, Brown 1–5; SJSU: Billy Freeman 6–67, Shane Smith 2–17, Crawley 2–14, Ervin 4–13, Thomas Tucker 1–13, Hansell Wilson 1–11, Justin Holmes 1–6, Josh Oliver 1–6.
Interceptions: SJSU: Cleveland Wallace 1–61.

Missouri

Sources:

Uniform combination: white helmet, blue jersey, white pants.

Game Stats: 
Passing: BYU: Tanner Mangum 23–41–0—244; MIZ: Drew Lock 19–28–1—244.
Rushing: BYU: Algernon Brown 7–42, Adam Hine 6–7, Francis Bernard 1–3, Tanner Mangum 1-(−6); MIZ: Russell Hansbrough 26–117, Ish Witter 13–34, Lock 3–26, Tyler Hunt 10–14, Ray Wingo 1–1, Team 2-(−2).
Receiving: BYU: Nick Kurtz 3–67, Bernard 4–56, Remington Peck 3–41, Colby Pearson 4–40, Mitch Mathews 4–20, Devon Blackmon 2–15, Mitch Jurgens 1–4, Brown 2–1; MIZ: Nate Brown 5–65, Witter 2–57, J'Mon Moore 3–49, Cam Hilton 3–36, Sean Culkin 1–16, Jason Reese 1–11, Wesley Leftwich 2–9, Hunt 1–2, Emanuel Hall 1-(−1).
Interceptions: BYU: Micah Hanneman 1–29.

Fresno State

Sources:

Uniform combination: white helmet, blue jersey, white pants.

Game Stats: 
Passing: FSU: Zack Greenlee 14–41–3—125, Kilto Anderson 4–7–0—65; BYU: Tanner Mangum 24–37–0—336, Remington Peck 1–1–0—15, Beau Hoge 1–1–0—11. 
Rushing: FSU: Marteze Waller 18–47, Kilto Anderson 1–29, Dejonte O'Neal 3–14, Dustin Garrison 3–12, Greenlee 5-(−17); BYU: Algernon Brown 11–97, Riley Burt 10–29, Mangum 4–14, Francis Bernard 6–8, Nate Carter 1–5, Hoge 1–5, Jonny Linehan 1–0.
Receiving: FSU: Jamire Jordan 8–54, Justin Johnson 3–45, Stratton Brown 1–43, KeeSea Johnson 2–27, Delvo Hardaway 1–10, Da'Mari Scott 1–6, Marteze Waller 2–5; BYU: Moroni Laulu-Pututau 3–95, Colby Pearson 4–55, Mitch Mathews 2–52, Terenn Houk 5–44, Nick Kurtz 4–41, Bernard 4–37, Devon Blackmon 2–20, Mitch Juergens 1–12, Remington Peck 1–6.
Interceptions: BYU: Kai Nacua 2–61, Fred Warner 1–27.

Utah State

Sources:

Uniform combination: white helmet, white jersey, white pants.

Game Stats: 
Passing: BYU: Tanner Mangum 16–30–0—284; USU: Chuckie Keeton 20–45–0—243.
Rushing: BYU: Algernon Brown 16–68, Francis Bernard 3–17, Harvey Langi 3–15, Adam Hine 1-(−2), Team 3-(−6), Mangum 5-(−18); USU: Devante Mays 19–54, Keeton 9–54, Lajuan Hunt 8–50, Tonny Lindsey 2–24, DJ Nelson 1–13, Nick Vigil 2–5, Hunter Sharp 1–2, Devon Robinson 1–0.
Receiving: BYU: Mitch Mathews 6–158, Kurt Henderson 2–39, Devon Blackmon 1–35, Brown 1–18, Nick Kurtz 1–13, Colby Pearson 1–7, Remington Peck 1–7, Bernard 2–4, Mitch Juergens 1–3; USU: Hunter Sharp 7–100, Andre Rodriguez 4–78, Tyler Fox 1–25, Wyatt Houston 2–24, Kenne Williams 1–13, Brand Swindall 1–11, Braelon Roberts 1–9, Jake Simonich 1-(−5), Lajuan Hunt 2-(−12).
Utah State 0–3 on Field Goals. Bronson Kaufusi blocks 2 FG's for BYU.

Las Vegas Bowl

Sources:

Uniform combination: white helmet with royal blue decals and royal blue chromium facemasks, royal blue jersey, white pants.
This was the final game for head coach Bronco Mendenhall, who accepted the same position with the Virginia Cavaliers on December 4, and for assistant coaches Robert Anae, Garett Tujague, Mark Atuaia, Jason Beck, Nick Howell, and Kelly Poppinga who accepted coaching responsibilities for the same positions at Virginia on December 9 & 10.

Game Stats: 
Passing: BYU: Tanner Mangum 25–56–3—315; Utah: Travis Wilson 9–16–0—71.
Rushing: BYU: Francis Bernard 7–58, Algernon Brown 5–12, Mangum 11–3, Squally Canada 1–1, Trey Dye 1-(−3); Utah: Joe Williams 25–91, Wilson 15–23, Tom Hackt 1–21, Bubba Poole 1–0, Britain Covey 1-(−1), Team 3-(−3), Kendal Thompson 1-(−5).
Receiving: BYU: Devon Blacmkmon 3–97, Terenn Houk 6–68, Nick Kurtz 4–56, Mitch Juergens 5–55, Bernard 2–19, Brown 2–9, Mitch Mathews 2–8, Remington Peck 1–3; Utah: Williams 2–22, Harris Handley 2–16, Tyrone Smith 1–15, Kenneth Scott 1–9, Thompson 1–8, Covey 2–1.
Interceptions: Utah: Tevin Carter 2–61, Dominique Hatfield 1–46.

After the game was completed, Tom Holmoe took time during the post-game press conference to announce that Kalani Sitake would become the BYU head coach beginning with the 2016 season.

Rankings

References

BYU
BYU Cougars football seasons
BYU Cougars football